Jil  ( Shivers) is a 2015 Indian Telugu-language action film directed by debutant Radha Krishna Kumar. It was produced by V. Vamsi Krishna Reddy and Pramod Uppalapati under UV Creations, The film stars Gopichand, Raashi Khanna, and Kabir Duhan Singh in lead roles, with the music composed by Ghibran. Released on 28 March 2015, the film was commercially successful and later dubbed into Hindi by Goldmines Telefilms and released in 2016.

Plot
In Mumbai, A gangster named Chota Nayak escapes from police custody and sets out to look for his aide-turned-foe Ranganath, who turned police informer and stole Nayak's money worth . Jai is a fire department officer who happens to help Ranganath who soon dies due to the fire accident. Nayak suspects Jai to be an accomplice of Ranganath and reaches Hyderabad to enquire him about Ranganath. Jai meets Savithri and they start dating to know about each other. 

Meanwhile, Nayak traces Jai and enquires him to reveal about his conversation with Ranganath, to which Jai objects and warns him not to trouble him again. Nayak threatens to kill whoever is close to Jai and keeps his word when he kills Jai's friend Ajay and Jai's uncle in a fire accident, after which Jai kills Nayak's brother. Jai then sends his family to a safe place, but Savithri, unaware of Nayak's presence, talk to Jai. Nayak then finds out about Savitri and captures her and he threatens to kill her if Jai does not hand over the money. Jai realizes where the money is and rifles through Ranganath's coat, where he finds a book containing the bank account and password where the money is located. 

Jai calls Nayak, and they meet at a desolate market for the exchange, but the exchange goes wrong when ACP Parasuram tries to capture Nayak. Nayak escapes, much to the Parasuram's dismay. Later, Nayak gains access to the bank account and finds it empty as all the money had been transferred to the injured Savithri's account. Nayak tries reviving Savithri in an abandoned construction site with the help of doctors, who revives her from the injuries and reveals her account number. Jai arrives and sets fire to the building where he sends Savithri in the hospital ambulance and defeats Nayak's henchmen and stops the financial transaction. Jai faces Nayak and brutally kills him, thus avenging Ajay and his uncle's death. After this, Jai goes on a date with Savithri.

Cast

 Gopichand as Jai
 Raashi Khanna as Savithri 
 Kabir Duhan Singh as Chota Nayak
 Harish Uthaman as ACP A. Parasuram
 Posani Krishna Murali as Narayana
 Amit Tiwari as Nayak's brother
 Chalapathi Rao as Jai's uncle
 Urvashi as Jai's aunt
 Brahmaji as Ranganath
 Bharath Reddy as Ali 
 Supreeth as Ghora
 Srinivas Avasarala as Ajay
 Prabhas Sreenu as Seenu 
 Ananth Babu as Doctor
 Raviprakash as Savithri's father
 Eswara Uday Sai Kiran as Patient

Soundtrack

The film's music was composed by Ghibran and released by Junglee Music Company.

Promotion and release
The first look teaser of the film was released on 6 March 2015 on the occasion of Holi. The movie was released on 27 March.

Reception
123telugu gave 3.25 out of 5 stars and wrote "On the whole, Jil is one of the most stylized films that has come out in the recent past. Stunning visuals, peppy music and decent performances are basic assets. If you end up bearing the routine story and a predictable second half, you can definitely watch the masala entertainer this weekend." 

Idlebrain rated the movie 3 out of 5 and reviewed that first half of the film is nice compared to the second half. It identified technical standards, production values, and songs as being strong components.
The Times of India gave 3 out of 5 stars and wrote "The tone of the film flip-flops from being drab to extremely violent within a matter of few minutes, which never lets you to sink your teeth deep into the story.".

References

External links
 

2015 films
2015 action films
Indian action films
2010s Telugu-language films
2015 directorial debut films
UV Creations films